The 2006 Wests Tigers season was the seventh in the Wests Tigers joint-venture club's history. They competed in the National Rugby League's 2006 Telstra Premiership.  They're based in based in the Inner West and Western Sydney.

Pre-season 

The Tigers played a trial game in Gunnedah against a local country side which they won easily. This was the only trial the team played before leaving for England to contest the 2006 World Club Challenge. This game pitted the 2005 NRL Premiers against Bradford who won the Super League title in 2005. The Tigers side were without many of the players from their grand final victory with notable absentees being Benji Marshall and Pat Richards. An early try to fill-in 5/8 Daniel Fitzhenry gave some hope but the Bulls dominated to eventually win 30-10.

Trial Results
v Combined Group 4 W 64-4 at Gunnedah (A)
v Bradford Bulls (Eng) L 10-30 at Huddersfield (A)
v Manly L 18-42 at Brookvale (A)

Regular season 

A series of close losses and a long list of injuries stymied the Tigers bid to defend their NRL premiership. In three games (Manly, Penrith, Newcastle) the Tigers led with less than 5 minutes to go only to concede late tries. In all three losses the game sealing tries came from kicks often involving freakish bounces or rebounds. Another two losses were from golden point (extra time) against Canberra, both in controversial circumstances. In the second game at Campbelltown the Daily Telegraph published a photograph showing Canberra players several metres offside which should have warranted a penalty. The referee Steven Clark later said he was reluctant to see a penalty decide the game. In the first game Tigers forward Todd Payten was penalised for a ball stripping offence with there being some debate whether a second player was involved.

The major injury loss was the star playmaker Benji Marshall. A cheekbone injury in round one was followed by another major shoulder injury against the Cowboys. These injuries meant Marshall played very little football. Captain and fullback Brett Hodgson missed the latter part of the season and Paul Whatuira also suffered long term injuries. One highlight was the successful debut of several players including Chris Lawrence and Ben Jeffery who starred in an upset win over eventual premiers Brisbane in Brisbane.
The Tigers eventually missed the playoffs but would have made the finals had they won the close losses referred to above.

Round 1, v Dragons
The St George Illawarra Dragons was the first assignment for the Tigers, and despite trailing 10-8 at halftime, the Tigers fought back with two tries to Paul Whatuira (who also scored the first try of the season proper) and s try to rookie Michael Crockett. All of the Dragons' tries had come from Mark Gasnier. The Wests Tigers won the match 24-15 after a late surge led by Marshall. It was later revealed Marshall had suffered a facial injury during the game.

Round 5, v Cowboys (2005 Grand Final Replay)
The Tigers headed to Townsville four weeks later, and despite a 2-0 lead early, the Tigers trailed 22-2 at halftime. Not helping their cause was the sin binning of centre Paul Whatuira in the 35th minute for a professional foul on Cowboys' Justin Smith. After enduring a try-less first half, the Tigers' tries came from Benji Marshall (who was booked for a high shot on Smith) and Isaac de Gois, playing one of only five games for the Tigers. The Tigers lost 32-12.

Round 6, v Sharks
The Tigers played their first home game at Campbelltown Stadium and thrashed the Cronulla Sharks who were missing skipper Brett Kimmorley who had injured his ankle in the previous week's 28-24 home loss to the Sydney Roosters. Brett Hodgson, playing in one of his finest games, broke the point-scoring record previously held by Joel Caine. The Tigers won the match 42-16, bringing them back on level terms for the season (3-3).

Round 14, v Sea Eagles
Wests Tigers headed into this Friday night blockbuster at Brookvale Oval having won their last two games including a 44-4 thrashing of the South Sydney Rabbitohs in round 12 and a morale-boosting win over the Cowboys in round 13. They led 12-10 with moments to go until a Matt Orford banana kick was fielded by full-back Brett Stewart who juggled the ball and scored the match-winning try. This broke the hearts of the Wests Tigers, who were headed for victory.

Round 16, v Panthers
With moments to go in the round 16 game at CUA Stadium, Benji Marshall painfully dislocated his shoulder whilst attempting a tackle on forward Frank Pritchard. The tackle ruled him out for the rest of the season and put the Tigers' premiership defence on tatters. The Tigers lost the game 24-20 after a Luke Lewis try sealed the game for the Panthers.

Round 21, v Broncos
Heading into this game as huge underdogs, the Wests Tigers arrived at Suncorp Stadium and were without skipper Hodgson, five-eighth Marshall, centre Whatuira (who reinjured his hamstring during training), and forwards Gibbs and Fulton. But they were never headed. Rookies Ben Jeffery and Chris Lawrence made their debuts and marked them with memorable tries. Centre Dean Collis scored two tries as the Tigers won 20-6.

Round 26, v Rabbitohs
Two traditional sides out of finals contention had something to play for at this Leichhardt Oval clash. Among those who played their last games in the Tigers colours included Anthony Laffranchi and Scott Prince (both Gold Coast Titans), John Skandalis and Shane Elford (both Huddersfield Giants). The Tigers were merciless, leading 30-0 at halftime and getting the job done in the second half, resulting in a 52-18 win.

Results

Players 
 (Debut: Round 1)

 (Debut: Round 11)
 (Debut: Round 21)

 (Debut: Round 21)
 (Debut: Round 22)

 (Debut: Round 1)

 (Debut: Round 26)

 (Debut: Round 3)
 (Debut: Round 3)
 (Debut: Round 17)
 (Debut: Round 1)

 (Debut: Round 21)

 (Debut: Round 6)

Ladder

Team Season statistics 
Overall: Played 24 Won 10 Lost 14 Competition Points 24 (11th) Points For 490 Against 565
Home: Played 12 Won 7 Lost 5
(Leichhardt Oval - Won 3 Lost 0)
(Campbelltown Stadium - Won 1 Lost 2)
(Telstra Stadium (Won 3 Lost 2)
(Jade Stadium NZ Won 0 Lost 1)
Away: Played 12 Won 3 Lost 9
Golden Point: Played 2 Lost 2
Highest Position: 5th (Rd 1) 
Lowest Position: 14th (Rd 21)
Biggest Win: 44-4 v South Sydney (A) Rd 12 (highest score 52 v South Sydney (H) Rd 26)
Worst Defeat: 4-46 v Melbourne (A) Rd 22 (most points conceded 47 v Bulldogs (A) Rd 2)
Home Crowd Average: 18 883 (LO 18 824)

Individual statistics 
Most tries: Daniel Fitzhenry (11)
Most points: Brett Hodgson (94)

References 

Wests Tigers seasons
Wests Tigers season